"The Sound of San Francisco" (or "San Francisco Dreaming'") is a song by the Austrian house group Global Deejays. It was released in November 2004 as the lead single from their album, Network. The song was one of the first Austrian dance songs to reach the top ten of more than 10 charts worldwide. 

It samples the Scott McKenzie song "San Francisco (Be Sure to Wear Flowers in Your Hair)".

Music video
The music video for the song is the group in a school bus as they tour the list of cities listed at the beginning of the song.

Chart performance

Weekly charts

Year-end charts

References

2005 singles
Global Deejays songs
2004 songs
Number-one singles in the Czech Republic
Number-one singles in the Commonwealth of Independent States